Elections to Penwith District Council were held for the first time in 1973. All 40 seats were contested. Independent candidates won an overwhelming majority, gaining 37 seats. The Labour Party, the Liberal Party, and a Residents' Association candidate each won one seat.

Results summary

Ward results

Hayle

Lelant and Carbis Bay

Ludgvan

Marazion

Penzance Central

Penzance East

Penzance North

Penzance South

St Buryan

St Ives

St Just

See also

Penwith District Council elections

References
Penwith District Council Election Results 1973-2007

1973 English local elections
1973
1970s in Cornwall